2014 FC Machida Zelvia season.

J3 League

References

External links
 J.League official site

FC Machida Zelvia
FC Machida Zelvia seasons